Webster County is a county located in the west central portion of the U.S. state of Georgia. As of the 2020 Census reflected a population of 2,348, making it the third-least populous county in Georgia. The county seat is Preston.

History
Webster County was created by an act of the Georgia General Assembly on December 16, 1853, as Kinchafoonee County.  A subsequent legislative act on February 21, 1856, changed the name to Webster.  The land for the county came from eastern portions of Stewart County.

The county is named for Daniel Webster, U.S. representative of New Hampshire and U.S. representative and U.S. senator of Massachusetts. Webster County's original name of Kinchafoonee came from the Kinchafoonee Creek which runs through the county.

Geography

The majority of Webster County, bordered to the southwest by State Route 520, is located in the Kinchafoonee-Muckalee sub-basin of the ACF River Basin (Apalachicola-Chattahoochee-Flint River Basin). The southwestern corner of the county is located in the Ichawaynochaway Creek sub-basin of the same ACF River Basin. A tiny edge of the southwestern border, just south of State Route 520, is located in the Middle Chattahoochee River-Walter F. George Lake sub-basin of the same ACF River Basin.

Major highways
  U.S. Route 280
  State Route 27
  State Route 41
  State Route 45
  State Route 153
  State Route 520

Adjacent counties
 Marion County – north
 Sumter County – east
 Terrell County – south
 Randolph County – southwest
 Stewart County – west

Demographics

2000 census
As of the census of 2000, there were 2,390 people, 911 households, and 675 families living in the county.  The population density was 11 people per square mile (4/km2).  There were 1,115 housing units at an average density of 5 per square mile (2/km2).  The racial makeup of the county was 50.50% White, 47.03% Black or African American, 0.08% Native American, 1.59% from other races, and 0.79% from two or more races.  2.76% of the population were Hispanic or Latino of any race.

There were 911 households, out of which 31.90% had children under the age of 18 living with them, 50.90% were married couples living together, 16.80% had a female householder with no husband present, and 25.90% were non-families. 23.50% of all households were made up of individuals, and 12.10% had someone living alone who was 65 years of age or older.  The average household size was 2.62 and the average family size was 3.07.

In the county, the population was spread out, with 25.20% under the age of 18, 8.20% from 18 to 24, 27.70% from 25 to 44, 24.10% from 45 to 64, and 14.80% who were 65 years of age or older.  The median age was 38 years. For every 100 females there were 101.00 males.  For every 100 females age 18 and over, there were 94.00 males.

The median income for a household in the county was $27,992, and the median income for a family was $32,462. Males had a median income of $26,444 versus $19,125 for females. The per capita income for the county was $14,772.  About 17.20% of families and 19.30% of the population were below the poverty line, including 26.00% of those under age 18 and 19.40% of those age 65 or over.

2010 census
As of the 2010 United States Census, there were 2,799 people, 1,119 households, and 788 families living in the county. The racial makeup of the county was 54.0% white, 42.3% black or African American, 0.3% Asian, 2.4% from other races, and 1.0% from two or more races. Those of Hispanic or Latino origin made up 3.5% of the population. In terms of ancestry, 18.6% were Irish, 9.9% were English, 8.0% were German, and 5.3% were American.

Of the 1,119 households, 34.4% had children under the age of 18 living with them, 46.8% were married couples living together, 16.4% had a female householder with no husband present, 29.6% were non-families, and 26.6% of all households were made up of individuals. The average household size was 2.50 and the average family size was 3.00. The median age was 40.6 years.

The median income for a household in the county was $25,708 and the median income for a family was $40,441. Males had a median income of $29,669 versus $27,745 for females. The per capita income for the county was $16,295. About 16.9% of families and 23.6% of the population were below the poverty line, including 25.8% of those under age 18 and 21.9% of those age 65 or over.

2020 census

As of the 2020 United States Census, there were 2,348 people, 1,140 households, and 724 families residing in the county.

Education
Webster County School District operates public schools.

Communities
 Archery
 Preston
 Weston

Politics

Webster County was reliably Democratic throughout the 20th century. However, the margins tightened in the 2000 election and in 2004, John Kerry only won this county very narrowly as Bush won Georgia's electoral votes easily. Webster County is the only county in Georgia that flipped to McCain's column in 2008 after voting for Kerry in 2004.

See also

 National Register of Historic Places listings in Webster County, Georgia
List of counties in Georgia

References

External links
 Consolidated Government of Webster County Including the City of Preston, Weston, and Webster County
  Webster County Board of Education a School system serving the City of Preston and Weston
 Webster County Sheriff's Department is the primary law enforcement agency for the entire county, and is an integral part of the county's system of justice.
 GeorgiaInfo Webster County Courthouse history
 County's Official Site
 Webster County in the New Georgia Encyclopedia.

 
Georgia (U.S. state) counties
1853 establishments in Georgia (U.S. state)
Populated places established in 1853
Majority-minority counties in Georgia